Matt Ritter (born 7 September 1974, in California) is an author, editor and botany professor at California Polytechnic State University at San Luis Obispo.

He specializes in cultivated trees, and is an expert of the genus Eucalyptus. Ritter is a former Editor-in-Chief of Madroño, the journal of the California Botanical Society. He is the California coordinator of the Official National Register of Big Trees and a contributing author to the second edition of the Jepson Manual of California native plants, and to the Flora of North America projects.

Books
Ritter, Matt (2005) Plants of San Luis Obispo, Their Lives and Stories, Kendall Hunt, Dubuque, IA

Ritter, Matt (2011) A Californian’s Guide to the Trees among Us, Heyday, Berkeley, CA

Ritter, Matt (2018) California Plants:  A Guide to Our Iconic Flora, Pacific Street Publishing, San Luis Obispo, CA/Heyday, Berkeley, CA

Ritter, Matt (2020) Rainwalkers, Pacific Street Publishing, San Luis Obispo, CA

Ritter, Matt (2021) Something Wonderful, Pacific Street Publishing, San Luis Obispo, CA

Awards
2011 R. W. Harris Excellence in Education Award from the International Society of Arboriculture.

2012 California Polytechnic State University at San Luis Obispo Distinguished Teaching Award

2018 California Urban Forests Council Excellence in Education Award

2018 California Independent Booksellers Alliance Golden Poppy Award for California Plants: A Guide to Our Iconic Flora

2020 Next Generation Indie Book Award Finalist for novel Rainwalkers

2021 Rubery Book Award Shortlisted for novel Rainwalkers

2021 Next Generation Indie Book Award Winner for Children's Illustrated Picture Book Something Wonderful

2021 National Outdoor Book Award Winner for Children's Illustrated Picture Book Something Wonderful

2021 California Urban Forests Council Excellence in Education Award

External links
 Matt Ritter's website
 Cal Poly Plant Conservatory website
 California Big Trees website
 California Botanical Society
 Pacific Street Publishing

American botanical writers
American magazine editors
1974 births
Living people
American ecologists
Dendrologists
Botanists active in California
Journalists from California
Scientists from California
Writers from California
California Polytechnic State University faculty
People from Sutter County, California
21st-century American male writers
21st-century American non-fiction writers
21st-century American botanists
American male non-fiction writers